Hasil Ghaat is a novel by Bano Qudsia. There is some controversy as to whether this book be classified as a novel.

It is mainly a collection of thoughts of an old Pakistani man Humayun Farid who is visiting his emigrant daughter Arjmand in United States. Most of the thoughts occur to him as he is sitting in the balcony of her daughter's home. The narrative may well be thought to be employing the stream of consciousness technique.

See also

Bano Qudsia
Raja Gidh
Ashfaq Ahmed

External links
Haasil Ghaat, Read online

Urdu-language fiction
Urdu-language literature
Books by Bano Qudsia
Urdu-language novels
Sang-e-Meel Publications books